Rose Bracher (1894 – 15 July 1941) was a British botanist and academic. She researched the ecology of the mud flats of the River Avon at Bristol and in particular the genus Euglena.

Bracher was born in Salisbury and obtained a B.Sc. in 1917, followed by an M.Sc. in 1918 and a Ph.D. in 1927, all from the University of Bristol. She worked as a demonstrator at the London School of Medicine for Women (1918–1920), was a lecturer at the East London College (1921–1924), and took up a post of lecturer at the University of Bristol in 1924 which she held until her death in 1941. Obituaries for Bracher were published in Nature and the Proceedings of the Linnean Society.

She was elected a Fellow of the Linnean Society in 1938.

In 1940 she was given the title of Senior Lecturer and in 1941 was the first non-professorial woman to be elected to the Senate of the University, a month before her sudden death.

The University of Bristol offers an annual prize in her memory, the Rose Bracher Memorial Prize for the best student in botany, zoology and biology.

Selected publications
Ecology in Town and Classroom J.W. Arrowsmith, Bristol, 1937
A Book of Common Flowers, illustrated by Dorothy Bromby; Oxford University Press, 1941

References

Further reading
 Renate Strohmeyer: Lexikon der Naturwissenschaftlerinnen und naturkundigen Frauen Europas. Verlag Harri Deutsch 1998, page 53.

 

1894 births
1941 deaths
Academics of the University of Bristol
Alumni of the University of Bristol
British botanists
British women academics
Fellows of the Linnean Society of London
Women botanists